Torsten Haverland (born 6 September 1965) is a German former sailor. He competed in the men's 470 event at the 1996 Summer Olympics.

References

External links
 

1965 births
Living people
German male sailors (sport)
Olympic sailors of Germany
Sailors at the 1996 Summer Olympics – 470
People from Ostprignitz-Ruppin
Sportspeople from Brandenburg